Nayalia is a genus of green algae in the family Chaetophoraceae.

The genus name of Nayalia is in honour of A.A. Nayal, who was an Egyptian botanist from the Department of Botany at Cairo University. 

The genus was circumscribed by Paul Claude Silva in Taxon vol.8 on page 63 in 1959.

References

Chaetophorales genera
Chaetophoraceae